John Hall (November 1729 – March 8, 1797) was an American lawyer from Annapolis, Maryland. During the American Revolution he was a member of the council of safety, a delegate to the Maryland convention in 1775, and Maryland delegate to the Continental Congress in 1775.

References

1729 births
1797 deaths
Politicians from Annapolis, Maryland
Continental Congressmen from Maryland
18th-century American politicians